Risoba repugnans is a species of moth of the family Nolidae first described by Francis Walker in 1865.

Distribution
It is found from India and Sri Lanka to the Solomon Islands.

Description
It has a wingspan of 40 mm. Head brown. Thorax and abdomen brownish white. Forewings brownish grey with a basal white patch slightly suffused with bright rufous. There are indistinct waved antemedial, postmedial, and sub-marginal lines. The orbicular is a speck, whereas reniform white with rufous center and edge. A large apical rufous patch with whitish lunule found on its inner side. Some rufous patches with white edges found on outer part of inner margin. A marginal series of dark specks present. Hindwings white with the fuscous outer are and ventrally with cell spot.

Subspecies
Risoba repugnans repugnans (Walker, 1865)
Risoba repugnans albistriata (Pagenstecher, 1888) (Bismarck Archipelago)

Biology
The larvae had been recorded on Melastoma sp.

References

Nolidae
Moths described in 1865